Peter Kam Pui-Tat (born August 23, 1961) is a music composer for Hong Kong films including The Warlords, Bodyguards and Assassins and Dragon.

Kam is an eight-time winner at the Hong Kong Film Awards.

Partial filmography
 Big Bullet (1996)
 Full Alert (1997)
 Gen-Y Cops (2000)
 The Accidental Spy (2001)
 Three (2002)
 Protege (2007)
 The Warlords (2007)
 Bodyguards and Assassins (2009)
 Shinjuku Incident (2009)
 Detective Dee and the Mystery of the Phantom Flame (2010)
 Dragon (2011)
 Cold War (2012)
 American Dreams in China (2013)
 Out of Inferno (2013)
 Kung Fu Jungle (2014)
 The White Haired Witch of Lunar Kingdom (2014)
 Helios (2015)
 Sword Master (2016)
 Love Off the Cuff (2017)
 Europe Raiders (2018)
 Double World (2019)
 I'm Livin' It (2020)
 Septet: The Story of Hong Kong (2022)

External links
 
 Peter Kam on HKMDB

Hong Kong film score composers
Hong Kong male composers
Hong Kong composers
Living people
Male film score composers
1961 births